The Salt Lake Tribune is a newspaper published in the city of Salt Lake City, Utah. The Tribune is owned by The Salt Lake Tribune, Inc., a non-profit corporation. The newspaper's motto is "Utah's Independent Voice Since 1871."

History
A successor to Utah Magazine (1868), as the Mormon Tribune by a group of businessmen led by former members of the Church of Jesus Christ of Latter-day Saints (LDS Church) William Godbe, Elias L.T. Harrison and Edward Tullidge, who disagreed with the church's economic and political positions. After a year, the publishers changed the name to the Salt Lake Daily Tribune and Utah Mining Gazette, but soon after that, they shortened it to The Salt Lake Tribune.

Three Kansas businessmen, Frederic Lockley, George F. Prescott and A.M. Hamilton, purchased the company in 1873 and turned it into an anti-Mormon newspaper which consistently backed the local Liberal Party. Sometimes vitriolic, the Tribune held particular antipathy for LDS Church president Brigham Young. In the edition announcing Young's death, the Tribune wrote:

In 1901, newly elected United States Senator Thomas Kearns, a Roman Catholic, and his business partner, David Keith, secretly bought the Tribune. Kearns made strides to eliminate the paper's anti-Mormon overtones, and succeeded in maintaining good relationships with the mostly-LDS state legislature which had elected him to the Senate. After Keith died in 1918 the Kearns family bought out Keith's share of the Salt Lake Tribune Publishing Company. Eventually, the parent company became Kearns-Tribune Corporation.

The company started up an evening edition in 1902, known as The Salt Lake Telegram. The Telegram was sold in 1914 and reacquired by the Tribune in 1930. It was phased out when the joint operating agreement was formed with the afternoon Deseret News, Salt Lake's daily newspaper owned by the LDS Church, in 1952.

John F. Fitzpatrick became publisher in 1924, ushering in what became seven decades of peaceful coexistence with the dominant LDS Church. In 1952 theTribune entered into a joint operating agreement with the Deseret News and created the Newspaper Agency Corporation.  Fitzpatrick was the architect of NAC at the request of LDS Church President David O. McKay whose newspaper was near bankruptcy at the time. Fitzpatrick died of a heart attack in 1960, and was succeeded by John W. Gallivan, who had been trained as the next publisher from the time he joined the Tribune in 1937. Gallivan often joked with aspiring journalism students, telling them the best way to the publisher's desk was to get yourself left on the doorstep of the owner. (He had been orphaned at the age of five, then taken in by his mother's half-sister, Mrs. Thomas Kearns.) In the late 1950s, in spite of reluctance from John Fitzpatrick about the future of television, Gallivan joined a measured Tribune investment with The Standard Corporation in Ogden, Utah, to build one of the first microwave and cable TV systems across northern Nevada. On weekends, Gallivan traveled by bus to Elko, Nevada, to oversee the construction beginnings. Gallivan and Denver cable investor Bob Magness merged their companies into Tele-Communications Inc. (TCI) which eventually became the largest cable television company in the world. The Tribunes ownership interest in TCI reached nearly 15%, which played a large role in later mergers between the two companies. Gallivan remained as Tribune publisher until 1984, and chairman of the board until 1997.

For almost 100 years, it was a family-owned newspaper held by the heirs of U.S. Senator Thomas Kearns. After Kearns died in 1918, the company was controlled by his widow, Jennie Judge Kearns, and then the newspaper's longtime publisher was John F. Fitzpatrick, who started his career as secretary to Senator Kearns in 1913 and remained publisher until his death in 1960. John W. Gallivan, nephew of Mrs. Kearns, joined the Tribune in 1937 and succeeded Fitzpatrick as publisher in 1960, remaining as chairman until the merger with TCI, Inc. in 1997. The Kearns family owned a majority share of the newspaper until 1997, when the company merged with TCI in an effort to minimize inheritance tax liabilities borne by the two largest shareholders in the Kearns family. A buy-back agreement was put in place, providing for the Kearns family to reacquire The Tribune, after the IRS required a five-year holding period. However, in the interim TCI was merged with AT&T Corporation. After intense pressure from the LDS Church, and intense counter-suits from the Kearns family, the Tribune was subsequently sold by AT&T to Denver, Colorado-based MediaNews Group in 2000.

In 2002, the Tribune was mired in controversy after employees sold information related to the Elizabeth Smart kidnapping case to The National Enquirer. Tribune editor James "Jay" Shelledy resigned from his job at the paper amid the fallout of the scandal. Two staffers also were removed from their positions as Tribune reporters.

In 2004 the paper decided to move from its historic location at the downtown Tribune building, to The Gateway development. Many people, including several Tribune employees, opposed the move, stating that it would harm the economy of Salt Lake's downtown. The move was completed in May 2005 and Tribune employees were told by Editor Nancy Conway, "It is just a building."

Bankruptcy

After emerging from bankruptcy in 2010, MediaNews Group lost control of its ownership to a hedge fund, Alden Global Capital. "The remainder of the Denver-based chain is owned by a consortium of lenders and by Singleton himself." In 2016, Huntsman Family Investments, LLC, a company controlled by Paul Huntsman, bought The Salt Lake Tribune. Paul Huntsman is the son of industrialist Jon Huntsman Sr. who serves as chairman of the holding company, and brother of former Utah governor and ambassador to Russia Jon Huntsman Jr.

Conversion to Nonprofit

On April 20, 2016, Huntsman Family Investments, a private equity firm headed by Paul Huntsman, son of industrialist Jon Huntsman Sr., announced that it would be buying the Tribune. He soon announced plans to take the paper non-profit. In November 2019 the newspaper won approval from the Internal Revenue Service to become a 501(c)(3) non-profit. In October 2020, the newspaper announced it would cease daily print publication at the end of the year, shifting instead to a weekly print product while maintaining a robust online presence. It is the first major (and first daily) U.S. newspaper to become a nonprofit.

In 2017, the Tribune was awarded the Pulitzer Prize for Local Reporting for "a string of vivid reports revealing the perverse, punitive and cruel treatment given to sexual assault victims at Brigham Young University, one of Utah’s most powerful institutions." The team included lead reporter Erin Alberty, managing editor Sheila R. McCann, reporters Jessica Miller and Alex Stuckey and editor/writer Rachel Piper. The package of winning stories also included an investigation into multiple reports that were not properly investigated by Utah State University.

In May 2018, the Tribune laid off over 38% of its newsroom staff, reducing headcount from 90 to 56. This was the fourth round of layoffs since 2011, and the first under the leadership of owner and publisher Paul Huntsman. The reason put forward for this was lower revenue due to decreased circulation and lower profit from online advertisements. Huntsman said that in the two years since he bought the newspaper, advertising revenues had declined 40%. 

In November 2019, the newspaper won approval from the Internal Revenue Service to become a 501(c)(3) non-profit. The newspaper became the first major, daily U.S. newspaper to become a nonprofit. In 2020, the Tribune shifted from becoming a daily newspaper to a weekly print edition. At the time, the paper had approximately 36,000 subscribers, a decline from a daily circulation of close to 200,000. Also in 2020, the Tribune ended its  joint partnership with the Deseret News, which had lasted for 68 years. From 2020 to 2021, the Tribune newsroom staff increased by 23%, with 33 reporters on staff in November 2021. The newly nonprofit paper also developed a variety of new projects.

Endorsements
In presidential elections, The Salt Lake Tribune endorsed George W. Bush in 2004; Barack Obama in 2008 and 2012; and Hillary Clinton in 2016. The paper discontinued making endorsements for all offices (local, state, and national) in 2019 upon becoming a non-profit corporation as IRS rules forbid endorsements of candidates by non-profits.

See also

 :Category:The Salt Lake Tribune people
 Pat Bagley - Editorial cartoonist or the Tribune
 Derks Field - minor league baseball park for the Salt Lake Bees named after  Tribune sports editor John C. Derks (1873–1944)
 Peggy Fletcher Stack – religion reporter for The Salt Lake Tribune
 Frank Hewlett - Washington bureau chief
 Robert Kirby – humor columnist for The Salt Lake Tribune
 Tom C. Korologos - Politician who began career at Tribune
 Florabel Muir - first female reporter for Tribune
 Jennifer Napier-Pearce - Former executive editor of the Tribune
 William Nelson - Wisconsin politician who was editor of the Tribune
 Harold Schindler – historian, television screenwriter and editor for The Salt Lake Tribune

References

Sources

Further reading

External links

 
 

1871 establishments in Utah Territory
Companies based in Salt Lake City
Mass media in Salt Lake City
Mormonism-related controversies
Newspapers published in Utah
Publications established in 1871
Non-profit organizations based in Utah
Nonprofit newspapers
Pulitzer Prize-winning newspapers